Namaka is the smaller, inner moon of the trans-Neptunian dwarf planet Haumea. It is named after Nāmaka, the goddess of the sea in Hawaiian mythology and one of the daughters of Haumea.

Discovery 
Namaka was discovered on 30 June 2005 and announced on 29 November 2005. It was nicknamed "Blitzen" by the discovery team before being assigned an official name.

Physical characteristics 
Namaka is only 1.5% as bright as its parent dwarf planet Haumea and is about 0.05% its mass. If it turns out to have a similar albedo, it would be about 170 km in diameter. Photometric observations indicate that its surface is made of water ice. Mutual events between 2009 and 2011 were expected to improve the knowledge of the orbits and masses of the components of the Haumean system, but interpreting those observations was greatly complicated by the unexpected non-tidally locked spin state of Hiʻiaka, the larger moon. Namaka is similar in size to Makemake's moon MK2, despite being smaller. Further observations of Hiʻiaka might allow to determine its rotation period and spin state more precisely, at which point it should be possible to remove its effect from the data obtained in 2009.

See also
Hiiaka, the other moon of Haumea

Notes

References

Moons of Haumea
Trans-Neptunian satellites
Discoveries by Michael E. Brown
Discoveries by Chad Trujillo
Discoveries by David L. Rabinowitz